Poena is a genus of moths of the family Erebidae. The genus was erected by Herbert Druce in 1891.

The Global Lepidoptera Names Index gives this name as a synonym of Arugisa Walker, 1865.

Species
Poena albomarginata H. Druce, 1891 Mexico, Guatemala
Poena drucella Nye, 1975 Guatemala
Poena hirsuta Schaus, 1916 Suriname

References

Calpinae